Danny Carroll (born November 4, 1963) is an American politician who has served in the Kentucky Senate from the 2nd district since 2015.

In early 2019, Carroll withdrew a bill (which he later claimed he did not write) that would put strict limits on access to public records.

In 2021, Carroll proposed a bill which would make it a crime to insult or taunt a police officer.

References

1963 births
Living people
Republican Party Kentucky state senators
People from Paducah, Kentucky
21st-century American politicians